Old North Church (officially, Christ Church in the City of Boston), at 193 Salem Street, in the North End, Boston, is the location from which the famous "One if by land, two if by sea" signal is said to have been sent. This phrase is related to Paul Revere's midnight ride of April 18, 1775, which preceded the Battles of Lexington and Concord during the American Revolution.

The church is a mission of the Episcopal Diocese of Massachusetts. It was built in 1723 and is the oldest standing church building in Boston and a National Historic Landmark.

Revolutionary history

Construction of the Old North Church began in April 1723, continuing throughout the year. Nine months later, the church was completed sufficiently enough for the congregation to hold and celebrate its first worship service on December 29, with only some interior finishing left to be completed. The architectural design was inspired by the works of Christopher Wren, the British architect who was responsible for rebuilding London after the Great Fire. Timothy Cutler was the founding rector after serving as third rector of Yale College from 1719 to 1722. Jason Haven was called to minister, but his parishioners at the First Church and Parish in Dedham convinced him to stay.

In April 1775, Paul Revere told three Boston patriots to hang two lanterns in the steeple. These men were the church sexton Robert Newman and Captain John Pulling Jr.—the two of whom historian David Hackett Fischer suggests each carried one lantern up to the steeple—as well as Thomas Bernard, who stood watch for British troops outside the church. The lanterns were displayed to send a warning to Charlestown patriots across the Charles River about the movements of the British Army.  Revere and William Dawes would later deliver the same message to Lexington themselves, but this lantern method was a fast way to inform the back-up riders in Charlestown about the movements of the British; these back-up riders planned to deliver the warning message to Lexington and Concord in case Revere and Dawes were arrested on the way.

The lanterns were hung for just under a minute to avoid catching the eyes of the British troops occupying Boston, but this was long enough for the message to be received in Charlestown. The militia waiting across the river had been told to look for the signal lanterns, and were prepared to act as soon as they saw them.

The meaning of two lanterns has been memorized by countless American schoolchildren. "One if by land, and two if by sea" is from Henry Wadsworth Longfellow's 1860 poem "Paul Revere's Ride". One lantern was to notify Charlestown that the British Army would march over Boston Neck and the Great Bridge, and two were to notify them that the troops were taking boats across the Charles River to land near the Phips farm on Lechmere Point in Cambridge (the British Army would take the "sea" route; thus, two lanterns were hung). After receiving the signal, the Charlestown Patriots sent out a rider to Lexington, but this rider did not reach his destination and his identity has disappeared from history, having possibly been captured by a British patrol.

But the warning was delivered miles away to dozens of towns, first by Revere and Dawes on horses, and then by other men on horses and men who rang church bells and town bells, beat drums, and shot off warning guns. The current status of the lanterns is not entirely clear; one is said to be in the hands of a private collector, another was broken during a tour, and yet another is on display at the Concord Museum.

Colonialism
As a port town, 17th c. Boston played an important role in the world of Atlantic trade. Established in 1723, Christ Church in the City of Boston (Old North Church) was Boston's second Anglican Church and was a "social nexus" for Boston's younger merchants and privateers. The older Anglican Church, King's Chapel, was a long-time favorite of Boston's wealthy elite. The esteemed status of the King's Chapel and its rapidly increasing membership, made it difficult for the younger, less wealthy merchants of Boston to participate in the congregation and signal their status in order to create these necessary social networks of exchange. Therefore, the Old North fulfilled that social function, supplying merchants and ship captains with a religious common ground to build their inter-Atlantic trust upon.

Evidence from the trial of a 1743 mutiny aboard the Rising Sun, a merchant ship, revealed some of Boston's merchants to be involved in the operations of a smuggling ring organized by Old North donor, Gedney Clark, who resided in Barbados though he was a MA-born merchant.

Merchants of Boston would trade goods and traffic enslaved African peoples throughout the Caribbean in exchange for cacao from the Dutch colony, Suriname. From Suriname, the cacao would be transferred to the British colony of Barbados. Laundering the cacao through Barbados was a means to make it a "British" product (as British subjects were not permitted to trade outside the British Empire) which allowed merchants to re-export the cacao to London, with a fraction being smuggled back to Boston as well. This cacao was the product of enslaved labor and was the source of British Colonial-Era chocolate in Boston.

These questionable enterprises were how Clark made a living, and thus how he would have paid for his 100-pound Old North donation in 1745. Clark and Peter Faneuil each donated 100 pounds to Old North, tying with each other as the two donors having given the greatest single gift amount for the purchase of the bells. The two Old North members aboard the Rising Sun, Captain Newark Jackson and merchant, George Ledain, did not survive the mutiny. Yet until  their deaths, they were pew owners who had made donations to fund the first steeple at Old North.

Historian Jared Ross Hardesty characterized the Church's role within the greater Atlantic world and in Boston as such: "Much like they laundered cacao through Barbados to make it a "legal" commodity, the men laundered their reputations through Old North, signaling that they were upstanding men of commerce who gave back to the community that supported their activities."

Logwood was another product that played a significant role in the church's history. Logwood was sought after for its purple-red hue, becoming popular as a base for stable black and deep purple dyes for fabric, leather, etc. It can only be grown in the Yucatan Peninsula, and was exported out of present-day Belize, from what was then known as the "Bay of Honduras." Before the 1720s, logwood was exported to England through Jamaica, but after 1720 it was exported to New England in order to be re-exported once again out of Boston and Newport, RI to England. Logwood quickly became one of the primary trade goods of the Americas at the time, second only to tobacco.

Like cacao, logwood was a product of the enslaved Black and Indigenous people whose labor made it an accessible commodity. With many Boston merchants profiting off of their participation in the logwood trade, a group of traders called the "Gentlemen of the Bay of Honduras" donated several loads of logwood to the Old North Church in 1727.

Their donation would largely fund the construction of the church's first steeple. "The Bay Pew," stylized in honor of the Gentlemen of the Bay of Honduras, stands at the front of the Old North Church today as the only remaining decorated pew in the church. Though the "Bay Pew" decor visitors see when they come to Old North today is not the original, the furnishing and fabric that adorn the pew demonstrate how some pew owners may have decorated their box pews.

Slavery

Slavery existed in the New England colonies as early as the 1630s. Indian wars of the 17th c., like the Pequot War and King Philip's War, resulted in the capture of Indigenous POWs, who were sold to the West Indies/ Caribbean in exchange for enslaved Africans. As one arm of the Atlantic Triangle Exchange, enslaved Africans were transported from the West Indies/ Caribbean to the Thirteen British Colonies on the Atlantic coast. Most ended up in plantation economies of the South, but some were taken to northern hubs of commerce, such as Boston. 18th century slaves in Boston were the descendants of this small population of enslaved Africans that ended up in the British colonies of New England.

Modern estimates suggest that enslaved Black African people made up 10-15% of Boston's 18th century population. Additionally, there were many forms of "unfreedom" that confined Black and Indigenous peoples and poor white Europeans. Until slavery was abolished in Massachusetts in 1783, it was commonplace for wealthy families in and around Boston to enslave Black and Indigenous peoples as supplemental to household labor. Many of Old North's members enslaved people, or profited off of their involvement in enterprises dependent on enslaved labor. Church records document the baptisms, marriages, and funerals of free and enslaved Black and Indigenous people.

The Old North Church's first rector, Timothy Cutler, was among those counted as enslavers. He enslaved a woman named Ann in his home. Cutler was a missionary of the Society for the Propagation of the Gospel in Foreign Parts (SPG), tasked with converting enslaved Black and Indigenous peoples in the area. The SPG was a pro-slavery organization that owned the Codrington Plantation in Barbados.

The Sanctuary and Upper Gallery

Old North Church's sanctuary was opened to the public in December 1723, with minimal work and plastering left to be completed. The box pews in the sanctuary would have cost an initial 30 pounds, but owners were also expected to pay an annual tax and make weekly contributions. If owners fell behind on their weekly contributions, the church reserved the right to sell their pew. Owning a pew made those owner's church proprietors and gave them a vote in all church matters. The church also had two pews in the back of the center aisle designated for "Wardens and Strangers" possibly to entice non-members to join the congregation.

The brass chandeliers were obtained in 1723. The current organ was installed in 1759 and built by Thomas Johnston of Boston. It took the place of a previous organ obtained in 1736. The four angels surrounding the organ were donated by Captain Thomas Gruchy, owner of pew #25, in 1746 after he captured them from a French ship during King George's War.

In 1726, the vestry voted to pay Thomas Bennet 70 pounds for building 24 pews in the North and South Galleries upstairs, in addition to 86 benches along the back walls. This seating would have been for people of lesser means, children under the age of 12, and Black and Indigenous church members.

The Upper Gallery housed the only discounted box pews in Old North. They cost about 20 pounds each, with families sometimes sharing a pew in order to make the cost more affordable. Congregants seated in the gallery could have been free, enslaved, or indentured Black people, Indigenous peoples, or those who couldn't afford to purchase a pew below. Enslaved people were expected to be baptized and were required to attend church with their enslavers. They could not sit amongst their enslavers and sat in the gallery instead. Sermons were often difficult to hear from up there, and its position made it the coldest area of the church in the winter and the hottest in the summer. There are several reasons Black and Indigenous people may have worshiped at Old North Church; they may have been forced to attend by an enslaver or employer, they may have sought the social currency an Anglican church membership accorded, or they may have chosen to attend for their own spiritual purposes. They endured uncomfortable and inequitable conditions for a multitude of reasons, most of which were necessary to their survival in British colonial era Boston.

Between 1806 and 1912, the box pews were replaced with slip pews to accommodate the growing congregation, passing through the center aisle seen today.The pews in the sanctuary were restored in 1912, with some of the original doors, hinges, and paneling from 1723. They are reported to be numbered the same way they were in 1731.

From 1831 to 1912, a third level to the gallery was added to the West wall of the church on each side of the organ. This gallery was built by Thomas Clark for the children attending the 19th century Sunday School.

In 1806, the box pews were deconstructed and replaced with slip pews, commonly seen in churches today, to allow for more congregants to attend services. Slip pews were still purchased up until the restoration of 1912. The slip pews were replaced with box pews, and those families who wished to remain pew owners were grandfathered in to do so. After 1912, the Old North Church became an open congregation and seating was open to the public on a first-come, first-served basis.

1912 Restoration

In the Spring of 1912, the Old North Church underwent a reconstruction to align more with the simple Puritan style of other churches in early MA history. The intent was to restore the church to how the Founding Fathers would have seen it, mistakenly assuming it adhered to the plain Puritan style popular in the era.

Under the direction of architects R. Clipson Sturgis and Henry C. Ross, the original floor timbers and gallery stairs were replaced. The box pews, which had been deconstructed to make room for slip pews in 1806, were reconstructed along with the raised pulpit. The interior woodwork was "incorrectly painted white, rather than in the rich variety of colors that have been described in early texts of the church."

The church re-opened December 29, 1912 (the 189th anniversary of its first service) to showcase its restoration. Theodore Roosevelt was in attendance, sitting in pew #25.

The Steeples

Old North Church's steeple is famous for the role it played in Paul Revere's April 18, 1775, lantern signal to warn militias in Charlestown that the British were coming, launching the American Revolution. For this, Old North's steeple has become an iconic symbol of liberty in the U.S.

While the 1727 load of logwood donated by the "Gentlemen of the Bay of Honduras" was a substantial contribution to the funds needed for the first steeple, in 1737 Old North Church leaders began a subscription campaign to collect the remaining funds needed to construct the first spire. In 1740, the spire, the design for which was attributed to William Price, was finished and hoisted atop Old North's tower. The golden weathervane crafted by Shem Drowne was fixed to the top, making Old North Church the tallest structure in Boston. A young Paul Revere served as a bell-ringer at Old North. It would be this steeple that he would incorporate into his 1775 plan to signal that the British were marching "by sea" across the Charles River.

The original steeple of the Old North Church was destroyed by the 1804 New England hurricane. In October 1804, a "very violent gale" blew the wooden spire from Old North's tower, destroying a house below it. Two years later, enough funds had been raised and a newly constructed spire was hoisted to the top once again in 1806. This replacement steeple's design was based on drawings from Charles Bulfinch.

The replacement steeple was toppled by Hurricane Carol on August 31, 1954. Hurricane Carol tore down the second spire, sending it crashing onto Salem Street and Hull Street, with minimal damage done to a building across the street. This time, the congregation launched a national fundraising campaign. In October 1955, the third spire was completed, it replicated the first original steeple and was fixed with steel reinforcements to prevent another disaster. Drowne's original weathervane, which was curiously "borrowed" by someone in the North End after the steeple came down the previous year, was restored atop the steeple. This is the steeple visitors to the Old North Church will see today.

The Bells

Eight change ringing bells (tenor:  in F) at Old North Church were cast by Abel Rudhall (Rudhall of Gloucester) in Gloucester, England, in 1744 and hung in 1745.  One bell has the inscription: "We are the first ring of bells cast for the British Empire in North America, A.R. 1744." The bells were restored in 1894 and in 1975. They are maintained and rung regularly by the Massachusetts Institute of Technology Guild of Bellringers.

The Crypt
In 2009, an archeologist began examining the estimated 1,100 bodies buried in 37 tombs in the basement. The crypt was in use between 1732 and 1860, and each tomb is sealed with a wooden or slate door, with many doors covered over by plaster as ordered by the city of Boston in the 1850s.

Notable burials include founding rector the Rev. Timothy Cutler and his wife, who are buried under the altar together. Other notable figures buried under the church include British Marine Major John Pitcairn, who died due to injuries received at the Battle of Bunker Hill and was entombed along with many other soldiers killed in this battle. Captain Samuel Nicholson of the USS Constitution is also buried in the crypt. A behind the scenes tour run by the church takes tourists down into the crypt, as well as up to the bell-ringing chamber.

The Clough House

Sitting behind the Old North Church on Unity Street, the Clough House is a historic building, serving multiple purposes for the Old North Historic Site. Ebenezer Clough, a master brick mason, built this house on pastureland around 1715. He went on to contribute his masonry skills to the construction of the Old North Church in 1723.

The Clough House is one of three remaining brick structures that date to the first decades of the 1700s in Boston. Today, the Clough House functions as an exhibit, gallery, and office space; housing the Printing Office of Edes and Gill and the Heritage Goods and Gifts shop.

History of Old North's Gift Shop

Built in 1918, this building originally functioned as a Waldensian chapel for Italian immigrants in the North End. In 1914, Old North's rector, William Dewart, realized he had the opportunity, as a fellow Protestant, to support these newcomers to Boston. Dewart made the Old North Church available for their worship on Sunday afternoons, arranging for the minister, Henry Sartorio, to give services in their native language, Italian. Cecelia Frances Lincoln of Brookline offered to help pay for a chapel if Old North would provide the land upon which to build it. On Thanksgiving Day, 1918, the chapel of St. Francis Assisi was dedicated. However, restrictions on immigration from Italy, coupled with the shifting of people living in the city to the suburbs, resulted in a rapidly eroding congregation by 1929. By the 1950s the chapel was no longer in use.

Around this time, interest in the Old North Church as a historic site was taking off, (aligning with national calls to restore the steeple in 1954) leading Old North to purchase the building and convert it to a museum and retail space. The museum aspect of the building was phased out, but the building remains Old North Church's gift shop today.

Multiple architectural details remain intact; the cross adorning the roof, the haloed figures carved into the pillars, and the stone lions that sit on either side of the steps are all a part of the original architecture, observable to visitors today. For this history, the gift shop is on the National Register of Historic Places.

19th Century History

Where the Parish House stands, there once was the Salem Street Academy, a Sunday school for children. Old North Church was part-owner of this school that opened on June 4, 1815. Excerpts from an 1830 report on the progress of the Sunday school reveals that it served a vital purpose to the community. Some who attended realized the opportunity for child-care, providing parents with the time to attend Old North Church's services themselves. The Sunday school also presented an alternative opportunity for those with lesser means to attend a kind of church service when they did not have the "suitable" clothing required for a regular service.

Following the resignation of Rev. Asa Eaton, Reverend William Croswell became rector of Old North in 1829. In 1833, Croswell and three other Anglican ministers hosted Reverend William Levington, the third Black man to be ordained to the Episcopal Church in America, to come speak at Old North Church to raise money to fund his own church and school for free Black children in Baltimore. In 1845, Rev. Croswell became the founding minister of the Church of the Advent, the first Anglican church in Boston that did not require the purchase of pews. Croswell fulfilled this dream of his, ministering to the less fortunate, serving as rector to the Church of the Advent until his death in 1851.

U.S. Bicentennial celebration

President Gerald Ford visited Old North Church on April 18, 1975. In his nationally televised speech, the President said, in part:

Let us pray here in the Old North Church tonight that those who follow 100 years or 200 years from now may look back at us and say: We were a society which combined reason with liberty and hope with freedom. May it be said above all: We kept the faith, freedom flourished, liberty lived. These are the abiding principles of our past and the greatest promise of our future.

Following President Ford's remarks, two lanterns were lit by Robert Newman Ruggles and Robert Newman Sheet, descendants of Robert Newman, who, as sexton of the Old North Church in 1775, lit the two lanterns which signaled the movement of British troops. The President then lit a third lantern, which hangs in a window of the church today.

On July 11, 1976, Queen Elizabeth II visited Boston as part of celebrations honoring the United States Bicentennial, and made reference to the aforementioned celebration events in April 1975 that followed President Ford's speech. She said: "At the Old North Church last year, your President lit a third lantern dedicated to America's third century of freedom and to renewed faith in the American ideals. May its light never be dimmed."

The Queen and Prince Philip attended a Sunday morning service at the Old North Church, sitting in front of the chancel.  The Rev. Robert W. Golledge led the service and later presented the Queen with a replica of a silver chalice made by Paul Revere. The Queen was shown the iconic statue of Paul Revere by Cyrus E. Dallin near the church before departing in a motorcade to attend a function at the Old State House.

Old North's Rectors

Old North Church's first rector was Reverend Dr. Timothy Cutler. Cutler was born in Charlestown, MA in 1684 and attended Harvard College. He served as president and rector of Yale College until 1722. In 1722, Cutler notified Yale's board of trustees that he, along with others, intended to seek ordination from the Church of England, admitting their doubt about their current ordination status as they had not been ordained by a bishop- which they felt the Scriptures mandated. This controversy came to be known by Congregationalists as the Yale Apostasy. After being released from his position by Yale, Cutler was invited to Boston by the committee building the Christ Church (Old North). Cutler journeyed to England for his ordination, returning to Boston one year later with a Doctorate in Divinity from both Oxford and Cambridge Universities. Cutler was ordained as a priest and a missionary for the Society for the Propagation of the Gospel in Foreign Parts. Cutler celebrated his first service at the Christ Church (Old North) on December 29, 1723. Cutler served at Old North until his death in 1765. As first rector, he is honored at Old North- entombed in the crypt, directly below the altar.

Like Timothy Cutler, Reverend Mather Byles Jr. left the Congregational ministry to be ordained as an Anglican priest. Like Cutler, Byles was an enslaver. Old North Church's records document the baptism of Byles’ enslaved servant, a man named Cato in early April 1775. Byles served the Christ Church in the City of Boston (Old North) from 1768- April 1775. 
In 1774 the British Parliament closed the port of Boston, in a series of punishments under the Intolerable Acts, for the Boston Tea Party the year prior in 1773. With trade stalled, the congregation could not source the funds needed to pay Byles. However, contributing factors were complex as Byles was also a loyalist, and there were rumors circulating that he was considering serving another church. We do not know what factors ultimately motivated the congregation or Byles’ decisions, but it is documented that on April 18, 1775, Byles met with the church proprietor's and turned his keys in. Later that evening, two men, who were likely vestryman Captain John Pulling Jr. and sexton Robert Newman, climbed the steeple and held high two lanterns to signal that the British were marching to Charlestown "by sea” across the Charles River. In March 1776, Byles, his family, and likely their enslaved people, sailed to New Brunswick accompanied by fellow loyalists. The Banishment Act of 1778 named Byles as a person who was forbidden from returning to Massachusetts, “to suffer death without benefit of clergy if he should return.”
The Christ Church (Old North Church) was closed, like many other Church of England congregations, until August 1778.

In the summer of 1776, Stephen Lewis sailed from England with General Burgoyne's 16th Regiment of Light Dragoons, as chaplain to the troops. The ship, troops, and Lewis were captured as prisoners of war; Lewis was held captive in the town of Boxford until 1778. In January 1778, Lewis was exchanged for a Continental Army prisoner of war and sent to New York. Before going to New York, he performed a private baptism at Christ Church (Old North), which had been closed since 1775. In July 1778, Lewis appealed to his captors saying he wished to sever his connection to the British government and wished to become, instead, a subject of Massachusetts. Records document that Lewis became the rector of Christ Church in August 1778, immediately resuming services thereafter. Lewis traveled to churches lacking a permanent clergy, to minister to the needs of their congregants, as most Anglican priests left Boston in 1776. During this time, prayers offered during service reflected the political temperaments of the era, no longer offering prayers for the King and royal family, as American Anglican churches moved away from loyalty to the King as head of the Church of England. Lewis served as rector of Christ Church (Old North) until 1784, when he moved to South Carolina. He died in 1790.

Other Worshippers

Recent research bridges the historical gap between the surplus of knowledge we have about wealthy and white Old North Church members, and the understudied experiences of Black and Indigenous congregants. Research on the Humphries family not only shines a light on their specific experiences within the congregation, but also serves as a representative archival presence that can inform us about the lives of other Black congregants.

John and Elizabeth Humphries were a free Black couple who first appeared in Old North's records in March 1748 with the baptism of their daughter, Deborah. Over the course of the next four years, John and Elizabeth baptized seven more children: Robert, Richard, James, Catherine, Elizabeth, Thomas, and Ruth. Five of the Humphries children were baptized on the same day. There was a funeral service for one of their daughters a few days after she had been baptized, and John died shortly after the baptism of their last child in 1751. Their family name was occasionally present on Old North Church's alms list: a list of families that received small donations from the church. After the death of John, three of their children were indentured out to Alexander Chamberlain, a sailmaker and prominent Old North member, in 1756 and 1757.Their youngest child, Ruth, who was just six at the time, was contracted to serve an indenture for twelve years.

A notice of death for an Indigenous woman named Jerusha Will, revealed that she had been taken in by the Humphries in 1743. She was baptized at Old North Church on May 9, 1743, passing away only a few days later, with orders being given to bury her on May 21 by Captain Steel to the "Overseers of the Poor."

In October 1765 an "Elizabeth Humphries" appears in Old North Church's marriage records, marrying an enslaved man named Robert Hunter. It cannot be known if Elizabeth was the mother or daughter. Their marriage is noteworthy because Elizabeth was a free woman marrying Robert, an enslaved man. Unlike in England, in the colonies, a child's status was dependent on that of their mother. In this unfree society, Elizabeth and Robert were ensuring their children would be born as legally free people.

The other "Old North"

Before the construction of the "Old North Church" (Christ Church, Boston), there was another church in Boston called the "Old North" (Meetinghouse). This Congregationalist meeting house was founded in North Square, across the street from what is now called "Paul Revere's house". This church was once pastored by the Rev. Cotton Mather, the minister now known largely for his involvement in the Salem witch trials.

Today
Old North Church is today one of four church sites among the 16 stops on the Freedom Trail. It is an active congregation of the Episcopal Diocese of Massachusetts with a Sunday morning service at 11 a.m. The current vicar is the Rev. Dr. Matthew Cadwell, who has served since November 2020.

Archives
Old North's church records are held by the Massachusetts Historical Society. They are available for researchers to view by appointment.

See also

 Forest Lawn Memorial Park (Hollywood Hills), where there is a replica of the church
 List of National Historic Landmarks in Boston
 National Register of Historic Places listings in northern Boston

References

Further reading
 Asa Eaton. Historical account of Christ church, Boston: A discourse in said church, on Sunday, December 28, 1823. Boston: Printed by J.W. Ingraham, 1824. Google books
 Henry Burroughs. A historical account of Christ Church, Boston: an address, delivered on the one hundred and fiftieth anniversary of the opening of the church, December 29, 1873. Boston: A. Williams & Co., 1874. Google books
 Christ Church, Salem Street, Boston, 1723. Boston: 1912. Google books
 Percival Merritt. The parochial library of the eighteenth century in Christ Church, Boston. Boston: Merrymount Press, 1917

External links

 Old North Church
 Mayo family history
 Boston National Historical Park Official Website
Listing and photographs at the Historic American Buildings Survey
Old North Church (Christ Church) at Find a Grave
C-SPAN American History TV Tour of Old North Church - Part 1
C-SPAN American History TV Tour of Old North Church - Part 2

1723 establishments in Massachusetts
18th-century Episcopal church buildings
18th-century establishments in Massachusetts
Boston National Historical Park
Churches completed in 1723
Churches on the National Register of Historic Places in Massachusetts
Episcopal church buildings in Massachusetts
Episcopal churches in Boston
Landmarks in North End, Boston
Libraries in British North America
Museums in Boston
National Historic Landmarks in Boston
National Register of Historic Places in Boston